The Comedy Company Album is the debut studio album by Australian comedy television series The Comedy Company. The album was released in November 1988 and peaked at number 9 on The Australian ARIA Charts.

At the ARIA Music Awards of 1989 the album won the ARIA Award for Best Comedy Release.

Track listing

Charts

Awards
The ARIA Music Awards are a set of annual ceremonies presented by Australian Recording Industry Association (ARIA), which recognise excellence, innovation, and achievement across all genres of the music of Australia. They commenced in 1987.

! 
|-
| ARIA Music Awards of 1989 || The Comedy Company Album || ARIA Award for Best Comedy Release ||  || 
|-

Release history

References

1989 albums
ARIA Award-winning albums
1980s comedy albums
The Comedy Company albums